Centaurea triumfettii, the squarrose knapweed, is a species of plant belonging to the genus Centaurea of the family Asteraceae.

Description
The squarrose knapweed is an herbaceous perennial plant. The leaves are undivided and narrow-lanceolate. The period of flowering is from May until August. The inner flowers are bright purple, the outer ones are azure blue or deep mauve.

Distribution
This species occurs in Afghanistan, Armenia, Austria, Canada, Czech Republic, France, Germany, Greece, Hungary, Iceland, Iran, Italy, Lebanon, Mexico, Norway, Poland, Slovakia, Spain, Sweden, Turkey Turkmenistan and United States.

Habitat
Centaurea triumfettii prefers dry and sunny places, in deciduous bushes, on meadows and subalpine grass slopes. The soil should be chalky. The species thrives at altitudes up to 2000 m above sea level. It is widespread in the mountains of southern and central Europe. Occasionally they are found as ornamental plants in gardens and parks.

References

 Zipcodezoo
 Euro+Med PlantBase - The information resource for Euro-Mediterranean plant diversity  Centaurea
 Pignatti S. - Flora d'Italia (3 vol.) - Edagricole – 1982, pag. 205 vol III

External links 

 Biolib

triumfetti
Flora of Italy
Flora of Lebanon